Mixtape, Vol. 1 may refer to:

Mixtape, Vol. 1 (Rare Essence album), a Rare Essence remix album hosted by DJ Dirty Rico (2012)
Mixtape, Vol. 1 (EP), an EP by Kane Brown (2020)
Mixtape Vol. 1, mixtape by Rock Mafia (2012)

See also
Kwesachu Mixtape Vol.1, by Kwes. & Micachu (2009)
T-Pain Presents: Nappy Boy Mixtape Vol. 1, mixtape by T-Pain (2014)
Turn Off the Radio: The Mixtape Vol. 1 by duo Dead Prez (2002)